Esperanto is the student magazine of Monash University's Caulfield campus in suburban Melbourne, Victoria, Australia. It is produced by students, for students and operates as part of MONSU Caulfield. The Editor, Designer and Marketing Director are hired by MONSU Caulfield.  Esperanto is one of the two print magazines at Australian based campuses of Monash University, with the other being Lots Wife Magazine (Est 1964).

History
Esperanto is the current incarnation of a student magazine that has been based on Caulfield campus since 1970, when it was known as Caulfield Institute of Technology, before it was absorbed by Monash University.  Over time, it has been variously called Cautisone, The Naked Wasp and Otico. The current name was settled upon when the 2003 editor of Otico trademarked the name and logo.

The magazine is named after Esperanto the universal language constructed by L.L. Zamenhof.

Notes

External links
 Esperanto 2010 issue 4
 Esperanto 2010 issue 5

Student newspapers published in Australia
Monash University